Bernice Coppieters (born 18 November 1970) is a Belgian retired ballet dancer and ballet master. She danced as an étoile at Les Ballets de Monte Carlo and is a long time collaborator of Jean-Christophe Maillot.  She is now the principal ballet master at the company and has staged Maillot's productions worldwide.

Biography
Born in Dendermonde, Belgium, Coppieters started training at the Antwerp Institute of Ballet in 1980. She join Royal Ballet of Flanders, where she became a soloist. She joined the Ballets de Monte-Carlo in 1991, and began a creative relationship with Jean-Christophe Maillot, which lasted almost 30 years. She was named étoile of the company by Caroline, Princess of Hanover in 1995. Coppieters became the principal ballet master in 2015. She has staged Maillot's productions in Sweden, Germany, Austria, South Korea, U.S., Czech Republic and Belgium.

Created roles by Maillot
Coppieters originated more than 40 roles in Maillot's productions, including:
Juliet in Romeo and Juliet
The Fairy Godmother and Wicked Stepmother in Cinderella
Meier in the Drosselmeier couple in Casse-Noisette Circus
Beauty in La Belle
Titania in Le Songe
Death in Faust
Princess Sheherazade in Sheherazade
Her Majesty the Night in LAC

Awards and honours 
1988: Prix de Lausanne
1995: Appointed Danseuse Etoile of the Ballets de Monte-Carlo by H.R.H. the Princess of Hanover
2002: Officier de l'Ordre du Mérite Culturel of the Principality of Monaco
2003: Positano "Léonide Massine" Award
2005: Étoile of the year award by Premio Danza at Danza
2011: Prix Benois de la Danse for the title role in Sheherazade
 2015: Officer of the Order of Cultural Merit.

References

1970 births
Prima ballerinas
Belgian ballerinas
Belgian expatriates in Monaco
Prix Benois de la Danse winners
Living people
People from Dendermonde
People from Monte Carlo
Prix de Lausanne winners
20th-century ballet dancers
21st-century ballet dancers